Caonao River is a river of northern Cuba.

See also
List of rivers of Cuba

References
The Columbia Gazetteer of North America. 2000.

Rivers of Cuba